Vetrișoaia is a commune in Vaslui County, Western Moldavia, Romania. It is composed of two villages: Bumbăta and Vetrișoaia.

References

Communes in Vaslui County
Localities in Western Moldavia
Populated places on the Prut